Callawayasaurus is a genus of plesiosaur from the family Elasmosauridae. When the holotype was first described by Samuel Paul Welles in 1962, it was described as Alzadasaurus colombiensis before being moved into its current genus by Kenneth Carpenter in 1999.

Etymology
Callawayasaurus  is named in honor of the paleontologist Jack M. Callaway, editor of Ancient Marine Reptiles who, as Carpenter put it, "in his brief career as a vertebrate paleontologist, did much to improve our understanding of marine reptiles." The familiar suffix, -saurus comes from the Greek , meaning "lizard" or "reptile."

Description
The nares of Callawayasaurus are elongated and positioned over the maxilla, which has 3-5 teeth.
The neck contains 56 vertebrae which are relatively short compared to other elasmosaurids. Callawayasaurus fossils have no pectoral bars; in common with other plesiosaurs such as Terminonatator. They also lack postaxial accessory facets.

Another nearly complete skeleton was found to be slightly more robust than the holotype specimen. This subtle change may indicate sexual dimorphism.

Distribution
The first Callawayasaurus remains were found in the Paja Formation near Leiva, Boyaca Colombia.
The specific name for the type, "columbiensis", means "from Colombia".
Callawayasaurus are known from the Aptian faunal stage of the early Cretaceous period, which extended from 125 to 112 million years ago.

See also

 List of plesiosaur genera
 Timeline of plesiosaur research

References

External links 
 Information on plesiosaurs, including images of a Callawayasaurus skull

Elasmosaurids
Early Cretaceous plesiosaurs
Early Cretaceous reptiles of South America
Plesiosaurs of South America
Cretaceous Colombia
Fossils of Colombia
Altiplano Cundiboyacense
Paja Formation
Fossil taxa described in 1999
Taxa named by Kenneth Carpenter
Sauropterygian genera